is a Japanese rapper, vocalist and lyricist. He was known by the moniker  from 2014 to 2018. In 2021, Tanaka formed a band with Ichika Nito and Sasanomaly called Dios.

Biography 

Tanaka (birth name unknown) was born in Yokohama, Japan, and went to school in the same area. He first became interested in releasing music in junior high school, and began uploading songs on the Japanese video streaming service Nico Nico under the moniker  from February 2012, at the age of 14. This name (later changing the name to ) was his utaite moniker, a Nico Nico specific term for a person who uploads sung vocal covers of Vocaloid songs. Among the songs he covered were Ishifuro's "Yurufuwa Jukai Girl", Denpol-P's "Hitorinbo Envy" and Hachi's "Donut Hole".

Tanaka became interested in rap music through the Nico Nico community Nico Rap, especially a rapper in the community called Vacon. After becoming friends, Vacon inspired Boku no Lyric no Bōyomi to try releasing original rap songs. In late 2012, he uploaded his first rap song, "One Night Stand and Rain". He decided on his stage name late at night while uploading the song, arbitrarily choosing the phrase . He felt that his voice while rapping sounded as if he were singing in a monotone instead of rapping, so decided on the name because of this. Originally he wanted to form a band, however did not have any friends who wanted to join in. As a student at an elite high school, he found that his friends had little interest in music, so he decided to release music as a solo act.

In April 2014, Boku no Lyric no Bōyomi released a free to download extended play through the independent hip-hop label Idler Records, a label run by Denpa Girl member Hashishi. Later in 2014, he was announced as one of the finalists of the Tokyo FM teen music contest Senkō Riot, after submitting the song "Sub/objective" because it had the biggest response on the internet. Boku no Lyric no Bōyomi submitted another song, "Fuckin' Summer Vacatioooooon!!!!!!!!!!!", for the contest's annual contestant compilation album.

In December 2015, Tanaka released his debut album Hollow World as Boku no Lyric no Bōyomi through newly founded JVC Kenwood Victor Entertainment sub-label Connectone, His second album Noah’s Ark (2017) features a collaboration with Latin jazz producer Nicola Conte, and "Be Noble", the theme song for the film March Comes in like a Lion Part 1 (2017).

In September 2018, Boku no Lyric no Bōyomi announced that he would leave the music industry, by releasing a final studio album, Botsuraku, and a compilation album, Ningen, on December 12. In 2019, he announced that he would change his stage name to Tanaka. In April 2021, Tanaka formed a band with Ichika Nito and Sasanomaly called Dios.

Discography

Studio albums

Extended plays

Compilation albums

Singles

Guest appearances

Songwriting credits

List of songs written by Boku no Lyric no Bōyomi for other artists.

Notes

References

External links 

Official website
Official blog

1998 births
21st-century Japanese male singers
Living people
Japanese hip hop musicians
Japanese male pop singers
Japanese rappers
Musicians from Yokohama